Devonport Rugby Club Est. 1964 is a Rugby Union club at the Don in Devonport, Tasmania. The club is a member of the Tasmanian Rugby Union and Tasmanian Rugby Union Juniors, affiliated with the Australian Rugby Union and plays in the Tasmanian Statewide League.
 
The club's home ground is at The Don Rugby Oval in  Devonport, Tasmania. Known as The Bulls, the club colours are green and black. The club currently fields teams in Men's First Division and Juniors competitions

Premierships

Senior Team
Statewide Premiers First Grade: 2014, 2017, 2019
Statewide Premiers Second Grade: 1999, 2000, 2001, 2005, 2007
Northern Premiers:  1984, 1985

In 2016, Devonport were booted from the finals series after being found guilty of playing an unregistered player in their home final against Eastern Suburbs.

In 2017, the Devonport Bulls recovered from a disappointing end to their 2016 campaign to once again make the statewide grand final, beating the Taroona Penguins who were entering the Grand Final undefeated.

References

External links
 Australian Rugby Union
 
 Devonport Rugby Club

Rugby union teams in Tasmania
Sport in Devonport, Tasmania
Rugby clubs established in 1964
1964 establishments in Australia
Women's rugby union teams in Australia